The 2013–14 Oregon State Beavers women's basketball team represented Oregon State University during the 2013–14 NCAA Division I women's basketball season. The Beavers, led by fourth year head coach Scott Rueck, played their games at the Gill Coliseum and were members of the Pac-12 Conference. They finished with a record of 24–11 overall, 13–5 in Pac-12 play for a tie for a second-place finish. They lost in the championship game in the 2014 Pac-12 Conference women's basketball tournament to USC. They were invited to the 2014 NCAA Division I women's basketball tournament which they defeated Middle Tennessee State in the first round before losing to South Carolina in the second round.

Roster

Schedule

|-
!colspan=9 |Exitbition

|-
!colspan=9 | Regular Season

|-
!colspan=9| 2014 Pac-12 Tournament

|-
!colspan=9| 2014 NCAA women's tournament

Rankings

See also
2013–14 Oregon State Beavers men's basketball team

References

Oregon State Beavers women's basketball seasons
Oregon State
Oregon State
2013 in sports in Oregon
2014 in sports in Oregon